Steve Buscemi is an American actor known for his performances in film, and television.

Buscemi is known for his collaborations with the Coen Brothers acting in five of their films Miller's Crossing (1990), Barton Fink (1991), The Hudsucker Proxy (1994), Fargo (1996), and The Big Lebowski (1998). Buscemi is also known for his role as Mr. Pink in Quentin Tarantino's Reservoir Dogs (1992), the Michael Bay films Con Air (1997) and Armageddon (1998), Tim Burton's Big Fish (2003), and Armando Iannucci's The Death of Stalin (2017). Buscemi is also known for his roles in television including a recurring roles in the drama series The Sopranos, the Tina Fey created sitcom 30 Rock, Portlandia, and a leading role in the Louis C.K.'s tragicomedy series Horace and Pete (2016).

Buscemi has received numerous awards and nominations for his role as Enoch 'Nucky' Thompson in the critically acclaimed HBO drama series Boardwalk Empire, created by Martin Scorsese. This includes two Primetime Emmy Award nominations, three Golden Globe Award nominations, and ten Screen Actors Guild Award (SAG) nominations. For his performance, he received a Golden Globe Award for Best Actor – Television Series Drama in 2011, and four SAG awards, two consecutive Outstanding Actor in a Drama Series awards (2011, 2012), and two consecutive Outstanding Ensemble in a Comedy Series (2011, 2012). Buscemi won his Primetime Emmy Award for Outstanding Short Form Variety Series for Park Bench with Steve Buscemi (2016).

Major associations

Primetime Emmy Awards

Daytime Emmy Awards

Golden Globe Awards

Screen Actors Guild Awards

Independent Spirit Award

Cannes Film Festival

Miscellaneous awards

References 

Buscemi, Steve